The Rossby number (Ro), named for Carl-Gustav Arvid Rossby, is a dimensionless number used in describing fluid flow. It is commonly used in geophysical phenomena in the oceans and atmosphere, where it characterizes the importance of Coriolis accelerations arising from planetary rotation. It is also known as the Kibel number.

The Rossby number (Ro, not Ro) is defined as

 

A small Rossby number signifies a system strongly affected by Coriolis forces, and a large Rossby number signifies a system in which inertial and centrifugal forces dominate. For example, in tornadoes, the Rossby number is large (≈ 103), in low-pressure systems it is low (≈ 0.1–1), and in oceanic systems it is of the order of unity, but depending on the phenomena can range over several orders of magnitude (≈ 10−2–102). As a result, in tornadoes the Coriolis force is negligible, and balance is between pressure and centrifugal forces (called cyclostrophic balance). Cyclostrophic balance also commonly occurs in the inner core of a tropical cyclone. In low-pressure systems, centrifugal force is negligible, and balance is between Coriolis and pressure forces (called geostrophic balance). In the oceans all three forces are comparable (called cyclogeostrophic balance). For a figure showing spatial and temporal scales of motions in the atmosphere and oceans, see Kantha and Clayson. 

When the Rossby number is large (either because f is small, such as in the tropics and at lower latitudes; or because L is small, that is, for small-scale motions such as flow in a bathtub; or for large speeds), the effects of planetary rotation are unimportant and can be neglected. When the Rossby number is small, then the effects of planetary rotation are large, and the net acceleration is comparably small, allowing the use of the geostrophic approximation.

See also

References and notes

Further reading 
For more on numerical analysis and the role of the Rossby number, see:
 
 
For an historical account of Rossby's reception in the United States, see
 

Atmospheric dynamics
Dimensionless numbers of fluid mechanics